The following highways are numbered 501:

Canada
 Alberta Highway 501
 Manitoba Provincial Road 501
 Ontario Highway 501

Japan
 Japan National Route 501

United States
   U.S. Route 501
  Florida State Road 501
  Maryland Route 501
  County Route 501 (New Jersey)
  Nevada State Route 501
  New Mexico State Road 501
  North Carolina Highway 501 (former)
  Ohio State Route 501
  Oregon Route 501
  Pennsylvania Route 501
  South Carolina Highway 501 (former)
  Washington State Route 501
  West Virginia Route 501
Territories
  Puerto Rico Highway 501